Joseph of Nazareth (Italian: Giuseppe di Nazareth) is a 2000 Italian made for television film dramatizing the life of Joseph of Nazareth. It was directed by Raffaele Mertes, who has directed several other Biblical movies, and Elisabetta Marchetti (it).

Cast
 Tobias Moretti – Joseph
 Stefania Rivi (it) – Mary
 Ennio Fantastichini  – Herod
 Massimo Reale (it) – Joses
 Francesco Dominedò (it) – Simon
 Andrea Prodan  – Antipater
 Imma Piro (it) – Anne
 Ida Di Benedetto – Elizabeth
 Mattia Sbragia – astrologer
 Renato Scarpa – scribe
 Omar Lahlou – Jude

References

External links

2000 films
Portrayals of the Virgin Mary in film
Bible Collection
Portrayals of Saint Joseph in film
2000s Italian-language films
2000s Italian films